Manuel Fernández was an Argentine rower. He competed in the men's eight event at the 1948 Summer Olympics.

References

External links
 

Year of birth missing
Possibly living people
Argentine male rowers
Olympic rowers of Argentina
Rowers at the 1948 Summer Olympics